WSGS is a Country formatted broadcast radio station licensed to Hazard, Kentucky, United States, serving Eastern Kentucky and Southwest Virginia.  WSGS is owned and operated by Mountain Broadcasting Service, Inc.

Due to the high altitude of the station's transmitter, WSGS's strong signal can be heard throughout eastern Kentucky, southwest Virginia, and northeastern Tennessee, including parts of the Tri-Cities.

References

External links
 WSGS Online
 

1947 establishments in Kentucky
Country radio stations in the United States
Radio stations established in 1947
SGS
Hazard, Kentucky